The 2021 Washington Mystics season was the franchise's 24th season in the Women's National Basketball Association (WNBA). The regular season tipped off versus the Chicago Sky on May 15, 2021.

The Mystics struggled to start the season only winning two of their six games in the month of May.  Their fortunes rebounded when they posted a .500 winning percentage through June and in their two games in July before the Olympic break.  In closing out their pre-Olympic schedule they won in overtime versus the Chicago Sky to finish the first portion of the schedule with an 8–10 record.  Coming back from the break, they faced a tough schedule and posted a 2–6 record, including losing the first four games back from the break.  To close out the season, September contained two wins book marked by two losses on either side.  Going into the last day of the season, the Mystics had a chance to secure a playoff spot, but lost to the Minnesota Lynx to miss the playoffs and finish with a 12–20 record.  Tina Charles was a bright spot during the season, as she led the league in scoring.

Transactions

WNBA Draft 

Due to a trade in 2020 for C Tina Charles, the Mystics did not make a selection in the 2021 Draft.

Trades and roster changes

Roster

Game log

Preseason

|- style="background:#fcc;"
| 1
| May 5
| Atlanta
| L 80–87
| Tina Charles (18)
| Jillian Alleyne (12)
| Natasha Cloud (3)
| Entertainment and Sports Arena0
| 0–1
|- style="background:#fcc;"
| 2
| May 8
| @ Minnesota
| L 68–79
| Tina Charles (18)
| Jillian Alleyne (8)
| Natasha Cloud (4)
| Target Center No Fans
| 0–2

Regular season

|- style="background:#fcc;"
| 1
| May 15
| Chicago
| L 56–70
| Tina Charles (14)
| Erica McCall (9)
| CloudMitchell (3)
| Entertainment and Sports Arena1,050
| 0–1
|- style="background:#fcc;"
| 2
| May 18
| Phoenix
| L 70–91
| Tina Charles (22)
| Tina Charles (12)
| Leilani Mitchell (7)
| Entertainment and Sports Arena1,050
| 0–2
|- style="background:#cfc;"
| 3
| May 21
| New York
| W 101–72
| Tina Charles (34)
| Tina Charles (13)
| Natasha Cloud (8)
| Entertainment and Sports ArenaNo Fans
| 1–2
|- style="background:#fcc;"
| 4
| May 23
| @ Indiana
| L 77–89
| Tina Charles (31)
| CharlesMcCall (9)
| Ariel Atkins (4)
| Bankers Life FieldhouseNo Fans
| 1–3
|- style="background:#cfc;"
| 5
| May 25
| @ Indiana
| W 85–69
| Tina Charles (30)
| Myisha Hines-Allen (10)
| Natasha Cloud (7)
| Bankers Life FieldhouseNo Fans
| 2–3
|- style="background:#fcc;"
| 6
| May 28
| @ Connecticut
| L 81–86
| Tina Charles (29)
| Myisha Hines-Allen (10)
| CharlesCloudHines-Allen (3)
| Mohegan Sun Arena2,102
| 2–4

|- style="background:#fcc;"
| 7
| June 5
| Las Vegas
| L 93–96
| Myisha Hines-Allen (32)
| Myisha Hines-Allen (13)
| Natasha Cloud (11)
| Entertainment and Sports Arena2,100
| 2–5
|- style="background:#cfc;"
| 8
| June 8
| Minnesota
| W 85–81
| Tina Charles (31)
| Tina Charles (8)
| Natasha Cloud (8)
| Entertainment and Sports Arena2,100
| 3–5
|- style="background:#cfc;"
| 9
| June 10
| Los Angeles
| W 89–71
| Ariel Atkins (23)
| Tina Charles (10)
| Natasha Cloud (5)
| Entertainment and Sports Arena2,100
| 4–5
|- style="background:#fcc;"
| 10
| June 13
| @ Atlanta
| L 78–101
| Myisha Hines-Allen (16)
| CharlesLeslie (7)
| Natasha Cloud (6)
| Gateway Center Arena1,122
| 4–6
|- style="background:#cfc;"
| 11
| June 17
| Atlanta
| W 96–93
| Ariel Atkins (32)
| Natasha Cloud (9)
| Natasha Cloud (11)
| Entertainment and Sports Arena2,100
| 5–6
|- style="background:#cfc;"
| 12
| June 19
| Indiana
| W 82–77
| Tina Charles (30)
| Tina Charles (15)
| Theresa Plaisance (4)
| Entertainment and Sports Arena2,100
| 6–6
|- style="background:#cfc;"
| 13
| June 22
| @ Seattle
| W 87–83
| Tina Charles (34)
| Tina Charles (16)
| Leilani Mitchell (7)
| Angel of the Winds Arena2,495
| 7–6
|- style="background:#fcc;"
| 14
| June 24
| @ Los Angeles
| L 82–89
| Leilani Mitchell (26)
| Tina Charles (10)
| Ariel Atkins (7)
| Los Angeles Convention Center520
| 7–7
|- style="background:#fcc;"
| 15
| June 26
| @ Dallas
| L 74–85
| Tina Charles (27)
| Tina Charles (10)
| Leilani Mitchell (7)
| College Park Center2,055
| 7–8
|- style="background:#fcc;"
| 16
| June 29
| Connecticut
| L 71–90
| Tina Charles (26)
| Theresa Plaisance (7)
| Ariel Atkins (5)
| Entertainment and Sports Arena2,100
| 7–9

|- style="background:#fcc;"
| 17
| July 3
| @ New York
| L 79–82
| Tina Charles (31)
| Tina Charles (16)
| Shavonte Zellous (5)
| Barclays Center1,615
| 7–10
|- style="background:#cfc;"
| 18
| July 10
| @ Chicago
| W 89–85 (OT)
| Tina Charles (34)
| Tina Charles (17)
| Natasha Cloud (11)
| Wintrust Arena8,331
| 8–10

|- style="background:#fcc;"
| 19
| August 15
| @ Las Vegas
| L 83–84
| AtkinsCharles (20)
| CharlesHines-Allen (8)
| Natasha Cloud (10)
| Michelob Ultra Arena3,024
| 8–11
|- style="background:#fcc;"
| 20
| August 17
| @ Las Vegas
| L 83–93
| Tina Charles (30)
| Tina Charles (10)
| Natasha Cloud (8)
| Michelob Ultra Arena3,241
| 8–12
|- style="background:#fcc;"
| 21
| August 19
| @ Phoenix
| L 64–77
| Tina Charles (17)
| Myisha Hines-Allen (9)
| AtkinsCloudPlaisance (2)
| Phoenix Suns Arena5,113
| 8–13
|- style="background:#fcc;"
| 22
| August 22
| Seattle
| L 78–85
| Tina Charles (20)
| Myisha Hines-Allen (17)
| Natasha Cloud (9)
| Entertainment and Sports Arena3,114
| 8–14
|- style="background:#cfc;"
| 23
| August 24
| Los Angeles
| W 78–68
| Myisha Hines-Allen (19)
| Natasha Cloud (8)
| Natasha Cloud (8)
| Entertainment and Sports Arena2,620
| 9–14
|- style="background:#fcc;"
| 24
| August 26
| Dallas
| L 77–82
| Myisha Hines-Allen (16)
| Delle DonneHines-AllenPlaisance (5)
| Natasha Cloud (7)
| Entertainment and Sports Arena2,465
| 9–15
|- style="background:#cfc;"
| 25
| August 28
| Dallas
| W 76–75
| Natasha Cloud (21)
| Erica McCall (8)
| Natasha Cloud (5)
| Entertainment and Sports Arena2,410
| 10–15
|- style="background:#fcc;"
| 26
| August 31
| Connecticut
| L 75–85
| Shatori Walker-Kimbrough (17)
| Hines-AllenMcCall (5)
| Natasha Cloud (12)
| Entertainment and Sports Arena2,269
| 10–16

|- style="background:#fcc;"
| 27
| September 4
| @ Indiana
| L 75–93
| Ariel Atkins (25)
| Tina Charles (8)
| Natasha Cloud (6)
| Target Center3,403
| 10–17
|- style="background:#fcc;"
| 28
| September 7
| @ Seattle
| L 71–105
| Shavonte Zellous (17)
| Megan Gustafson (8)
| Sydney Wiese (4)
| Angel of the Winds Arena2,390
| 10–18
|- style="background:#cfc;"
| 29
| September 10
| Atlanta
| W 82–74
| Tina Charles (26)
| Tina Charles (16)
| CloudPlaisance (6)
| Entertainment and Sports Arena2,320
| 11–18
|- style="background:#cfc;"
| 30
| September 12
| @ Chicago
| W 79–71
| Tina Charles (31)
| Tina Charles (10)
| Natasha Cloud (8)
| Wintrust Arena4,707
| 12–18
|- style="background:#fcc;"
| 31
| September 17
| @ New York
| L 80–91
| Ariel Atkins (29)
| CloudHines-Allen (5)
| CharlesCloud (7)
| Barclays Center3,615
| 12–19
|- style="background:#fcc;"
| 32
| September 19
| Minnesota
| L 77–83
| Natasha Cloud (22)
| Tina Charles (13)
| Natasha Cloud (5)
| Entertainment and Sports Arena2,854
| 12–20

Standings

Statistics

Regular Season

Source:

Awards and honors

References

External links 
 Official website of the Washington Mystics

Washington Mystics
Washington Mystics
Washington Mystics seasons